The Pleasant River is in the Otago region of New Zealand. It rises in hilly forested country near Mount Trotter, west of Palmerston, fed by many small streams.

References

Rivers of Otago
Rivers of New Zealand